Bhalu is a Marathi-language movie released in October 1980. The movie has been produced by Uma Bhende and directed by Raj Dutt.

Plot 
Orphaned during her childhood, Sajjala is raised by Appakaka, an ex-army man who is a dear friend of Sajjala's father.  He fixed her marriage to Advocate Jayantrao, son of Jagirdar, but of Ramrao rank;  The sly and shrewd chieftain of the village cannot bear this and convinces the zamindar against Sajjala.  Instead, dampening her spirit, Sajja sends a letter through her faithful and loyal companion Bhaa, clearing Jayantrao of his misunderstanding.  Police Inspector Khandekar, who is Jayantrao's friend, exposes Ramrao's plot.  When Jayantrao confronts Ramrao, he brazenly refuses.  Ramrao later poisons Jayantrao, but Appakaka is tricked and arrested.  As Jayantrao is on his deathbed, lawyer MLA Pawar's niece Sumitra accepts the challenge to release Appakaka.

Cast 

 Nilu Phule as Ramrao Rank 
 Ranjana as Sumitra
 Prakash Bhende as Jayantrao 
 Uma Bhende 
 Vikram Gokhale as Fauzdar Khandekar
 Nana Patekar as Rangarao 
 Viju Khote 
 Chandrakant Kulkarni
 Asha Patil
 Majnakar

Soundtrack
Music

The music was directed by Vishwanath More.

Lyrics

The lyrics is written by P. Savalaram

Track listing

References

External links 
  IMDB - imdb.com
 Movie Review - gomolo.com

1980 films
1980s Marathi-language films